Leucanopsis orooca is a moth of the family Erebidae. It was described by William Schaus in 1924. It is found in Bolivia and Argentina.

References

Further reading 

orooca
Moths described in 1924